Protaminase may refer to one of two enzymes:
Lysine carboxypeptidase
Carboxypeptidase B